Batman Unlimited: Mechs vs. Mutants is a 2016 American animated superhero film and the third and final entry in the Batman Unlimited series. It premiered on July 24, 2016, at San Diego Comic-Con International, to be followed by a digital release on August 30 and a DVD release on September 13.

Synopsis
Damian, the new Robin, is upset by his failure at trying to stop the Joker the previous evening, making his humiliation of falling off a building and having to be saved by Batman worse because it was caught by a video blogger and posted on the World Wide Web. Alfred Pennyworth tries to assure him that he's still learning, though Damian wishes he could talk to someone else who has been through the Robin training as Red Robin is away with his team. Batman arrives as Damian is studying Batman's enemies, and comes across the Penguin, who he has never met.

In the Arctic, Penguin, who has been in exile following the events of Batman Unlimited: Animal Instincts, is depressed at having lost everything. His only companion is Buzz, a penguin who seems to understand Oswald's predicament. His roommate, the isolationist-scientist Mr. Freeze, tries to repel a group of oil drillers near his ice cave, using one of his inventions to mutate an isopod into a gigantic monster to attack them. The Drillers use a new laser-drilling sled to attack the monster, and in the process, damages Freeze's invention, turning the monster back into an isopod, which causes Mr. Freeze to depart in anger. Penguin sees a way to capitalize on this, and encourages Mr. Freeze to take him back to Gotham City where he assures Mr. Freeze the means to achieve his goals.

Back in Gotham, Bruce and Damian are attending the new Technology Showcase at Wayne Tower where Dr. Kirk Langstrom is unveiling a new single-operator drilling mech which can melt rock in order to mine more easily. Bruce receives a call from Alfred that someone is attempting to break into Arkham Asylum. Oliver Queen, who is present at the showcase, sees them leave and follows them.

At Arkham, Penguin and Mr. Freeze drill into the asylum and freeze the guards, then bypass several inmates such as Cheetah, Hush, Mad Hatter, and Two-Face, before freeing Bane, Chemo, Killer Croc and Clayface. They also pass Joker on their way out who is upset that Penguin refuses to free him as well. Batman, Robin, and Green Arrow arrive and battle the villains, only to have Mr. Freeze and Bane successfully pull an escape with their allies.

At the Batcave, Batman tries to figure out what they're up to, but comes up empty while comparing MO's and criminal histories. Robin figures out that there is a pattern based on Bane, Clayface, and Chemo's  chemically altered DNA. And Killer Croc's strong constitution would make him an ideal test subject. Batman uses this info to track down the forced chemical mixture through a croma-spectral scanner. Meanwhile, in their undersea cave hideout, Mr. Freeze uses Bane's super-steroid Venom, Clayface's shape-shifting protoplasm, and Chemo's toxic waste to create a serum to transform Killer Croc into a gigantic, ice-spewing monster. He injects the same serum into Chemo. Killer Croc emerges from the sea, on the East side of the city, sucking up water and blasts Gotham with his ice breath, while Chemo freezes Gotham from the West, with an ice blaster, turning the city into a frozen wasteland.

While on their way to Freeze's hideout, Batman and Robin see the mutated supervillains, and attempt to stop Croc and Chemo with the Batmobile and Batplane, but proves to have little success. The Flash, Nightwing and Green Arrow are saving citizens as best they can while Croc attacks the GCPD headquarters. Despite their best efforts, the police can't stop the gigantic Killer Croc. Meanwhile, Mr. Freeze and Penguin turn on each other, both wanting to eliminate their rivals for control of Gotham. However, Penguin's henchbird Buzz has stolen samples Mr. Freeze's formula, which Bane and Clayface  inject themselves with to turn themselves into monsters. Despite his warning about the effects of the serum on the other two,  Mr. Freeze is easily dispatched and Penguin sends Bane and Clayface after Batman. Bane, however, has a score to settle with Croc, who sold him out to the Gotham Police, and attacks the gigantic Croc. Clayface locates Batman and Robin and attacks them, only to have Freeze's formula alter his body, turning him into a giant lava monster.

Batman gives the key to the Batmobile to Robin and tells him to distract Lava-Clayface, while he goes to Wayne Enterprises to get a special project Langstrom has been working on: a Bat-Mech the same size as Croc and the others. Green Arrows arrives and reveals that he had Langstrom build an Arrow-Mech for him, which Langstrom states that he received a contract from Queen Industries for research and development. Batman goes to deal with Croc and Bane, while Green Arrow goes to deal with Chemo. Batman then sends Langstrom to go help Robin, who was unable to stop Lava-Clayface, who then, with Flash and Nightwing, build a special laser cannon to stop Lava-Clayface.

The two heroes engage the trio of monsters, Batman quickly defeats Killer Croc, who with the serum's mutational effects wear off, shrinking Croc back to his normal size and state, and while Green Arrow manages to destroy Chemo's ice blaster (stopping the freezing process), he barely holds his own against Chemo's elastic arms and chemical spit. Meanwhile, Mr. Freeze, racked by guilt over his manipulation and betrayal by Penguin, aids the heroes in perfecting their cannon to use against Lava-Clayface. After Batman defeats Bane(who, like Croc, returns to his normal size and state), he goes to help Green Arrow battle the more powerful Chemo, who causes a Queen Industries build to collapse on him, damaging the Arrow-Mech. Working together, the pair manage to crack open Chemo's shell open, giving Batman the chance to drain the chemicals (which also contains the serum) out of the monster with a vacuum containment device, defeating Chemo and shrinking him back to his normal size. Mr. Freeze, though injured by Lava-Clayface, is able to get the freeze ray to work and freezes Lava-Clayface solid. With Croc and Chemo defeated and back to normal, Gotham's climate slowly starts return to normal. Noticing this, Penguin and Buzz try to escape, but they are captured by the Bat-Mech.

Penguin and his cohorts are arrested, along with Mr. Freeze who admitted that he was responsible for Gotham's icy conditions, but will get a trial for his involvement. Penguin and the others are  sent back to Arkham, while Buzz the penguin is sent to a zoo, where he meets a female penguin who falls in love with him. In Arkham Asylum, Joker gets even with Penguin for leaving him in Arkham instead of freeing him. Langstrom starts to repair the Mechs and upgrade them, just in case of another giant monster attack.

The other heroes leave the Batcave and Batman congratulates Robin on doing a good job. Damian feels better in his role as Robin than he did before, the two then head to the training room, with Alfred on watch duty.

The movie ends with a regular-sized, normal Clayface escaping his icy-prison after being accidentally freed by some kids and slinking into the sewers.

Voice cast
 Roger Craig Smith as Batman/Bruce Wayne
 Oded Fehr as Mr. Freeze
 Lucien Dodge as Robin/Damian Wayne
 Dana Snyder as Penguin, Buzz
 Chris Diamantopoulos as Green Arrow/Oliver Queen, Cobblepot Guard (uncredited)
 Phil LaMarr as Dr. Kirk Langstrom, Arkham Asylum Guard (uncredited) 
 Will Friedle as Nightwing/Dick Grayson
 Charlie Schlatter as The Flash/Barry Allen
 Carlos Alazraqui as Bane
 John DiMaggio as Killer Croc, General Sam Lane
 Dave B. Mitchell as Clayface, Hush (uncredited), Chemo (uncredited)
 Troy Baker as Joker, Two-Face
 Alastair Duncan as Alfred Pennyworth, Mad Hatter (uncredited)
 Richard Epcar as Commissioner James Gordon

References

External links
 

2010s animated superhero films
Batman Unlimited (film series)
2010s American animated films
2010s direct-to-video animated superhero films
2016 direct-to-video films
Films directed by Curt Geda
Films produced by Sam Register
2010s English-language films